Kurt Heyndrickx (born 30 August 1972) is a Belgian equestrian. He competed in the team eventing at the 2000 Summer Olympics.

References

External links
 

1972 births
Living people
Belgian male equestrians
Olympic equestrians of Belgium
Equestrians at the 2000 Summer Olympics
Sportspeople from Sint-Niklaas
20th-century Belgian people